The Caribou Master, variously known as Kanipinikassikueu, Katipenimitak, Papakashtshishk, or Caribou Man is a powerful spirit in traditional Innu religion and mythology, an indigenous people of present-day Canada and Quebec. In the myth, an Innu man goes to live with the caribou. He marries one of the does and is himself transformed into caribou form. He becomes the master of the caribou and the provider of caribou for the Innu people.

References

 Innu Myth
 Peter Armitage, "The Innu (the Montagnais-Naskapi)", Indians of North America, Chelsea House Publishers, 1991, 1555467172, p. 83
 B. C. Goddard, "Rangifer and Man: An ancient relationship", in Proc. Ninth Workshop North American Caribou, edd. S. Coutourier and Q. van Ginhoven, Kuujjuac, Quebec, 2003.  Rangifer special volume 14, pp. 15–28
 Kaneuketat, Georg Henriksen, "I dreamed the animals: Kaniuekutat : the life of an Innu hunter", Berghahn Books, 2009, pp. 110–111
 Interview of Jerry Alfred (Northern Tutchone, Selkirk First Nation) by Hubl Greiner in Pelly Crossing, Canada, 2013.  Telling of the legend of "Caribou Man" by Jerry Alfred.

Algonquian mythology
Animal gods
Innu culture